Vincent Tabaillon (born January 18, 1975) is a French film editor. His credits include The Incredible Hulk, Clash of the Titans, Now You See Me and Baahubali: The Beginning.

Life and career 
Tabaillon was born in Sete, Hérault, France, and started his career editing films for Luc Besson's EuropaCorp. He was associated with French director Louis Leterrier's films which include The Incredible Hulk, Transporter 2 and Now You See Me.  His prominent works also include Taken 2 for Fox Broadcasting Company, The Prodigies for Warner Bros., The Legend of Hercules for Summit Entertainment and The Prodigies.

In 2003, he was given the Lutin Award for Best Editing for the 2002 French short film called Squash.

Tabaillon is also known for editing an international cut of India's most expensive film Baahubali: The Beginning. Though the film was initially edited by Kotagiri Venkateswara Rao for its domestic audience, Tabaillon was hired by Arka Media Works to re-edit the film for international markets. This international cut, 20 minutes shorter than the original version, was screened at Busan International Film Festival and was scheduled to be released in China, Japan and many European and Latin American countries.

Filmography

References 

1975 births
Living people
French film editors
People from Sète